Metropolitan Joseph may refer to:

 Metropolitan Joseph (Petrovykh), Metropolitan of Leningrad in 1926–1927
 Joseph Al-Zehlaoui, Metropolitan of the Antiochian Orthodox Christian Archdiocese of North America since 2014